Satgachhia Assembly constituency is a Legislative Assembly constituency of South 24 Parganas district in the Indian State of West Bengal.

Overview
As per order of the Delimitation Commission in respect of the Delimitation of constituencies in the West Bengal, Satgachhia Assembly constituency is composed of the following:
 Bishnupur II community development block
 Chakmanik, Burul, Gaza Poali, Kamra, Naskarpara, Rania and Satgachhia gram panchayats of Budge Budge II community development block

Satgachhia Assembly constituency is a part of No. 21 Diamond Harbour (Lok Sabha constituency).

Members of Legislative Assembly

Election Results

Legislative Assembly Election 2011

Legislative Assembly Elections 1977-2006
In 2006 and 2001, Sonali Guha of AITC won the Satgachhia Assembly constituency defeating her nearest rivals Kabita Kayal and Gokul Bairagi, both of CPI(M), respectively. Jyoti Basu of CPI(M) defeated Chittaranjan Bag of INC in 1996, Amar Bhattacharya of INC in 1991, Sardar Amjad Ali of INC in 1987, Dinabandhu Bairagi of INC in 1982 and Jumman Ali Molla of INC in 1977. The seat did not exist prior to that.

References

Notes

Citations

Assembly constituencies of West Bengal
Politics of South 24 Parganas district